Oxylobium, commonly known as shaggy-pea, is a genus of flowering plants in the family Fabaceae all of which are endemic to Australia.

Description
Oxylobium range in size from prostrate to short, upright shrubs, mostly with simple, hairy stems especially when young. The leaves are mostly opposite or whorled, occasionally alternate. The pea-flowers yellow, orange or yellow-red, borne in leaf axils or at the end of branches. Flowering usually occurs in spring.

Taxonomy
The genus Oxylobium was first formally described by Henry Cranke Andrews in 1807, the description was published in The Botanist's Repository for New, and Rare Plants and the type specimen was Oxylobium cordifolium.

Species

The following is a list of species of Oxylobium accepted by the Australian Plant Census:

 Oxylobium arborescens R.Br.—tall shaggy pea
 Oxylobium cordifolium Andrews
 Oxylobium ellipticum (Vent.) R.Br.—common shaggy pea, golden shaggy pea
 Oxylobium pulteneae DC.—wiry shaggy pea
 Oxylobium robustum J.Thompson

References

Mirbelioids
Fabaceae genera
Fabales of Australia
Taxa named by Henry Cranke Andrews